Elis is a given name, used for both men and women.

Notable men with this given name
 Alfred Elis Törnebohm (1838–1911), Swedish geologist
Elis Bakaj (born 1987), Albanian footballer
Elis Eriksson (1906–2006), Swedish artist
Elis Gruffydd (1490–1552), Welsh writer
Elis James (born 1980), Welsh comedian
Elis Sandin (1901–1987), Swedish cross country skier
Elis Sipilä (1876–1958), Finnish gymnast
Elis Strömgren (1870–1947), Swedish-Danish astronomer
Elis Wiklund (1909–1982), Swedish cross country skier

Notable women with this given name
Elis Ligtlee (born 1994), Dutch track cyclist
Elis Meetua (born 1979), Estonian football player
Elis Paprika (born 1980), Mexican singer-songwriter
Elis Regina (1945–1982), Brazilian singer

See also 
Elis (surname)
Elis (disambiguation)
Ellis, similar given name and surname 

Unisex given names